Sylvan is a masculine given name and a surname which may refer to:

Given name
 Sylvan Adams (born 1958), Israeli-Canadian businessman
 Sylvan Anderton (born 1934), English footballer
 Sylvan Barnet (born 1926), American literary critic
 Sylvan Ebanks-Blake (born 1986), English footballer
 Sylvan Byck (1904-1982), American comic strip editor
 Sylvan Edwards (born 1979), English rugby union player
 Sylvan Fox (1928-2007), American journalist
 Sylvan Friedman (1908–1979), American politician
 Sylvan Goldman (1898-1984), American businessman
 Sylvan Gotshal (1897-1968), American lawyer
 Sylvan Ambrose Hart (1906-1980), American mountain man
 Sylvan Kalib (born 1929), American music theorist
 Sylvan Levin (1903–1996), American pianist
 Sylvan Muldoon (1903-1969), American esotericist
 Sylvan Richardson (born 1965), British guitarist
 Sylvan Shemitz (1925-2007), American lighting designer
 Sylvan Wittwer (1917-2012), American agronomist

Surname
 Kaj Sylvan (born 1923), Danish sprint canoer who competed in the late 1950s
 Per Sylvan (1875-1945), Swedish Army lieutenant general
 Richard Sylvan (1935-1996), Australian logician and environmentalist also known as Richard Routley
 Sanford Sylvan, American operatic baritone
 Torsten Sylvan (1895–1970), Swedish equestrian who competed in the 1924 Summer Olympics

See also
 S. Sylvan Simon (1910–1951), American stage/film director and producer
 Sylvain, a list of people with the given name

Masculine given names